In ancient Roman religion, the Epulum Jovis (also Epulum Iovis)  was a sumptuous ritual feast offered to Jove on the Ides of September (September 13) and a smaller feast on the Ides of November (November 13). It was celebrated during the Ludi Romani ("Roman Games") and the Ludi Plebeii ("Plebeian Games"). 

The gods were formally invited, and attended in the form of statues. These were arranged on luxurious couches (pulvinaria) placed at the most honorable part of the table. Fine food was served, as if they were able to eat.  The priests designated as epulones, or masters of the feast, organized and carried out the ritual, and acted as "gastronomic proxies" in eating the food.

See also
Lectisternium
Sellisternium
Religion in ancient Rome
Glossary of ancient Roman religion

References

Ancient Roman festivals
September observances 
November observances
Religious festivals in Italy
Festivals of Zeus
Jupiter (mythology)